Alvin Paul Kletzsch was a Milwaukee resident in the 1900s. He was a real estate agent and was known as the “Father of organized football in the city of Milwaukee”. He served as the first head football coach at the University of Wisconsin–Madison for a single season in 1889, compiling a record of 0–2.

Head coaching record

References

Wisconsin Badgers football coaches
1861 births
1941 deaths